The Cold River is a  tributary of Otter Creek in Rutland County, Vermont, in the United States.

The Cold River rises northeast of North Shrewsbury in the Coolidge Range, part of the Green Mountains. It flows southwest through North Shrewsbury, then turns northwest to the town line with Clarendon, where it turns west and flows through the village of North Clarendon.

The Cold River is crossed by the Appalachian Trail and by U.S. Route 7.

See also
List of rivers of Vermont

References 

Rivers of Vermont
Tributaries of Lake Champlain
Rivers of Rutland County, Vermont